A cold drop (from the Spanish "gota fría") is a term used in Spain that has commonly come to refer to any high impact rainfall events occurring in the autumn along the Spanish Mediterranean coast. In Europe, cold drops belong to the characteristics of the Mediterranean climate. It is also termed a cutoff low.

Occurrence

Spain
If a sudden cut off in the stream takes place (particularly in the Atlantic Ocean), a pocket of cold air detaches from the main jet stream, penetrating to the south over the Pyrenees into the warm air in Spain, causing its most dramatic effects in the Southeast of Spain, particularly along the Spanish Mediterranean coast, especially in the Valencian Community. The torrential rain caused by cold drop can result in devastation caused by torrents and flash floods. For instance, the great Valencia flood of 1957 was the result of a 3-day-long cold drop.

This phenomenon is associated with extremely violent downpours and storms, with wind speeds of 100–200 km (60–120 mi)/hour, but not always accompanied by significant rainfall. For this it is necessary that the high atmospheric torrential rain instability in the lower air layers to combine with a significant amount of water vapors. Such a combination causes the masses of cold air to quickly discharge up to 500 liters per square meter in extremely rapid rain episodes. This phenomenon usually lasts a very short time, as it exhausts its water reserves without receiving a new supply.

Other areas
Cut-off lows are apparent near the Sierra Nevada de Santa Marta in the Colombian Caribbean, with peaks surpassing 5 km in altitude in close proximity to a warm sea. They can also occur elsewhere in the southern hemisphere, such as in South Africa, Namibia, South America and southern Australia. In the northern hemisphere, besides Southern Europe, they can occur in China and Siberia, North Pacific, Northeastern United States and the northeast Atlantic.

See also 
 Cold-core low
 Cold pool
 Polar vortex

References

Flood
Types of cyclone
Atmospheric dynamics
Meteorological phenomena
Cold
Weather events